Margaret Elizabeth Dunstan (née Baylis; 28 October 1920 – 7 January 2010) was a New Zealand poet and writer.

Biography 
Dunstan was born in Christchurch, New Zealand, on 28 October 1920, and was educated at Wellington East Girls' College. She began writing poetry when she was an adult, and her first poems were published in English and American magazines and in the New Zealand Listener. She initially sent her work to publishers under the name Patrick Duggan, as she thought editors would be more likely to select submissions written by a man.

Dunstan set up writing workshops in her home to encourage other women poets, and invited more experienced and well-known poets to tutor the newer writers. She also worked with  psychiatric patients, and helped them to produced poems of publishable standard.

Her writing spanned a range of subject areas. Some deal with issues of life in urban and suburban areas, and others discuss the tension between domestic demands on her time and her aspirations as a writer.

Dunstan was a member of the Penwomen's Club and in 1985 she co-edited Hyacinths and Biscuits, the club's diamond jubilee prose and verse anthology.

Dunstan died in Auckland on 7 January 2010.

Publications

Poetry 

Patterns on glass: selected poems, Christchurch, N.Z., Pegasus Press, 1968
A particular deep: selected poems, Christchurch, N.Z., Pegasus Press, 1974
Sunflowers and sandcastles: a selection of poems for children, Wellington, N.Z., Millwood Press, 1977
In and out the windows, Auckland, N.Z., Hodder and Stoughton, 1980
Behind the stars: poems for children, Auckland, N.Z., Hodder and Stoughton, 1986
Red Horse and the undersea rescue, Wellington, N.Z., Silver Owl Press, 1993
I can do anything, Auckland, N.Z., Heinemann Education, 1995

Memoirs 

 A Fistful of Summer, Christchurch, N.Z., Whitcoulls, 1981
 The Other Side of Summer, Auckland, N.Z., Hodder and Stoughton, 1983

References

1920 births
2010 deaths
Writers from Christchurch
People educated at Wellington East Girls' College
New Zealand poets
New Zealand memoirists